This is a list of all inmates of the fictitious Wentworth Detention Centre in the television series Prisoner, known as Prisoner: Cell Block H in The United States and Britain and Caged Women in Canada. Note that episode numbers cited are for first and last appearances; many characters had spells where they were absent for long periods of time and subsequently returned. Also, characters' appearances in recaps are not included if they died in the previous episode, unless their corpse is seen at the beginning of the next episode (e.g. Paddy Lawson):

Characters list

See also
 List of Prisoner characters – prison staff
 List of Prisoner characters - miscellaneous

References

Lists of Prisoner (TV series) characters